"Fever" is a song by American pop vocalist and American Idol season eight runner-up Adam Lambert. The song was written by Lady Gaga, Rob Fusari and Jeff Bhasker for Lambert's debut album, For Your Entertainment. It was released as a radio-only single in New Zealand in September 2010.

Background
"Fever" is a song written by Lady Gaga and was released in October and November respectively to New Zealand and Singapore. The early radio release in New Zealand was to help promote the Glam Nation Tour which was extended to Australia during the final quarter of 2010.

Lambert also announced through Twitter that he had collaborated with Lady Gaga. "Yes it's true: I spent yesterday in the studio with the insanely talented and creative Lady Gaga recording a song that she wrote! I love her."

Critical reception
The song was met with critical acclaim. The Star noted that "his larger-than-life pipes do shine" on this "out-and-proud club stomper." Huffington Post wrote that this is one of songs that "full-display" of album that "operates from a disco/glam aesthetic of escapism and liberation via dance, dress-up, and desire" and added that it "fully accomplish what the singer had in mind for the album: songs that make you want to let loose, dance, work out, have fun." Slant Magazine noted that this song wasn't very original and wrote that "true to GaGa's utter lack of subtlety, is a song about a hard-on" but the song was praised "phenomenally well-crafted pop single that gives Lambert the opportunity to shine." Allmusic highlighted this song and praised it by calling it terrific disco and pop song and added "GaGa wisely goes so far as to keep the object of his affection male." Boston Globe was positive: "[song] makes a convincing case for Lambert as a long-lost Scissor Sister with its eruptive synths." Entertainment Weekly also similarly praised song "future-disco glitter bomb (...) sounds like it was extracted directly from the Scissor Sisters' sonic DNA." Detroit News also called this song "daring" and "unapologetic sexual" and added that its opening lines "is bound to raise an eyebrow or two from "Idol's" more conservative fan base. LA Times called the song "much better" than some songs on album and described it as "straight-ahead, guilt-free cry of love." NY Times called this song notable exception and added that "recent success [of Lady Gaga] proves that there’s at least some tolerance for quasi-intelligent identity manipulation in the pop sphere, wiggle room that Mr. Lambert barely takes advantage of." A. V. Club noted that this song "fits" and described it as "Lady Gaga’s ode to wanton debauchery".

Live performances
Gaga performed that song in The Cutting Room in 2006. The song was performed on Lambert's 2010 Glam Nation Tour.

Credits and personnel
Credits taken from For Your Entertainment album liner notes.

Adam Lambert – vocals
Lady Gaga – songwriting
Rob Fusari – songwriting
Jeff Bhasker – composition, production
Abe Laboriel Jr. – drums
Brian Ray – guitar
Henry Strange – programming
Anthony Kilhoffer – assistant recording
Ghazi Hourani – assistant engineer, phase operator
Mark "Spike" Stent – mixing engineer
Matty Green – assistant engineer

Charts

Release history

References

2009 songs
2010 singles
Adam Lambert songs
Jive Records singles
RCA Records singles
Song recordings produced by Jeff Bhasker
Songs written by Jeff Bhasker
Songs written by Lady Gaga
Songs written by Rob Fusari